Lăpugiu de Jos is a commune in Hunedoara County, Transylvania, Romania. It is composed of ten villages: Baștea (Bástya), Cosești (Kosesd), Fintoag (Fintóág), Grind (Gerend), Holdea (Holgya), Lăpugiu de Jos, Lăpugiu de Sus (Felsőlapugy), Lăsău (Laszó), Ohaba (Ohába) and Teiu (Tyej).

References

Communes in Hunedoara County
Localities in Transylvania